The Georgian National Museum unifies several leading museums in Georgia.
The museum was established within the framework of structural, institutional, and legal reforms aimed at modernizing the management of the institutions united within this network, and at coordinating research and educational activities. Since its formation on December 30, 2004, the Museum has been directed by professor David Lordkipanidze.

The Georgian National Museum integrates the management of the following museums:
Simon Janashia Museum of Georgia, Tbilisi
Samtskhe-Javakheti History Museum, Akhaltsikhe
Open Air Museum of Ethnography, Tbilisi
Art Museum of Georgia, Tbilisi, and its branches
Museum of the Soviet Occupation, Tbilisi
Dmanisi Museum-Reserve of History and Archaeology, Dmanisi
Vani Museum-Reserve of Archaeology, Vani
Museum of History of Tbilisi, Tbilisi
Museum of History and Ethnography of Svaneti, Mestia
Institute of Palaeobiology, Tbilisi
Sighnaghi Museum, Sighnaghi
Bolnisi Museum, in Bolnisi

See also 
List of museums in Tbilisi
List of museums in Georgia

References

Museums in Georgia. Ministry of Culture, Monuments Protection and Sport. Retrieved on December 16, 2007.

Museums established in 2004
National museums
Museums in Tbilisi
Art museums and galleries in Georgia (country)
2004 establishments in Georgia (country)